"Adorations" is Killing Joke's first single from their sixth studio album, Brighter than a Thousand Suns, released in August 1986. All of the releases were mixed by Julian Mendelsohn and Zeus B. Held, and produced by Chris Kimsey and Stewart Levine.

The single was accompanied by a music video of the band performing the song in a cathedral.

Track listings 
"Adorations" was released in several versions including remixes. The 7" vinyl single, released in the UK, France, and Spain, was a shorter edit of "Adorations", with "Exile" (also from Brighter Than A Thousand Suns) as its B-side. The 12" featured an extended mix as its A-side, with "Exile" and an extended mix of "Ecstasy" on the B-side.

"Adorations (The Supernatural Mix)" was released on 12" vinyl in the UK and featured "Love Like Blood (The '86 Remix)" and "Exile" as B-sides.

E.G. also released a 7" limited-edition double vinyl single exclusively in the UK featuring the remix of "Adorations" as the A-side, "Exile" as the B-side, "Ecstasy" as the C-side, and "Adorations (Instrumental Mix)" as the D-side. A cassette maxi single was also released.

7" single 
Side A
"Adorations" – 04:09

Side B
"Exile" – 06:09

Limited double 7" single 
Side A
"Adorations" – 04:38

Side B
"Exile" – 06:04

Side C
"Ecstasy" – 04:08

Side D
"Adorations (Instrumental Mix)" – 04:02

12" Extended Mix 
Side A
"Adorations (The Extended Mix)" – 05:08

Side B
"Exile" – 6:04
"Ecstasy (The Extended Mix)" – 06:27

12" Supernatural Mix 
Side A
"Adorations (The Supernatural Mix)" – 06:34

Side B
"Love Like Blood (The '86 Remix)" – 06:17
"Exile" – 06:02

Cassette Maxi single 
Side One
"Adorations (The Supernatural mix)" – 06:41
"Ecstasy" – 04:10

Side Two
"Exile" (06:09
"Love Like Blood (The '86 Remix)" – 06:29

Track listings notes

Charts

References

External links 

1986 songs
Killing Joke songs
Songs written by Jaz Coleman
Songs written by Paul Raven (musician)
Songs written by Paul Ferguson
Songs written by Geordie Walker
Song recordings produced by Chris Kimsey
E.G. Records singles
Virgin Records singles